The Fires of Conscience is a lost 1916 American silent drama film directed by Oscar Apfel and starring William Farnum. It was produced and released by the Fox Film Corporation.

Cast 
 William Farnum as George Baxter
 Gladys Brockwell as Margery Burke
 Nell Shipman as Nell Blythe
 Henry A. Barrows as Robert Baxter 
 Henry Hebert as Paul Sneed 
 William Burress as Randolf Sneed
 Elinor Fair as Mabel Jones 
 Willard Louis as Doc Taylor
 Brooklyn Keller as Felix Lunk
 Fred Huntley as Peter Rogers

See also
1937 Fox vault fire

References

External links 

American silent feature films
1916 drama films
1916 films
Lost American films
Fox Film films
American black-and-white films
Silent American drama films
Films directed by Oscar Apfel
1916 lost films
Lost drama films
1910s American films